Hot Wheels: World's Best Driver is an arcade-style video game based on the Hot Wheels toyline by Mattel, developed by Firebrand Games and published by Warner Bros. Games. It was released on September 17, 2013, for Windows, PlayStation 3, Xbox 360, Wii U, Nintendo 3DS, and iOS.

Gameplay
World's Best Driver is an arcade-style video game. Players can play as either the Green, Red, Blue, and Yellow Team. Each team possess a different skill asset: Green Team focuses on speed, Red Team focuses on stunts, Blue Team on drifting, and Yellow Team on desctruction.

Reception

Hot Wheels World's Best Driver received generally unfavorable reviews.

References

2013 video games
Arcade video games
Chillingo games
Firebrand Games games
Hot Wheels video games
IOS games
Multiplayer and single-player video games
Nintendo 3DS games
PlayStation 3 games
Racing video games
Video games developed in the United Kingdom
Warner Bros. video games
Wii U games
Windows games
Xbox 360 games